Asteromyrtus magnifica is a species of plant in the myrtle family Myrtaceae that is endemic to the Northern Territory of Australia.

Description
The species grows as a slender shrub or small tree up to 3 m in height by 1.5 m across. The bark is brown, rough and fibrous. The flowers occur as cream to yellow globular inflorescences.

Distribution and habitat
The species has a restricted distribution in the Top End of the Northern Territory. It occurs among dissected rocky outcrops and along seasonal creeks on the sandstone plateaus of Arnhem Land as well as on Groote Eylandt and adjacent islands.

References

 

 
magnifica
Myrtales of Australia
Flora of the Northern Territory
Endemic flora of Australia
Plants described in 1958